The Monument to the fallen Shipyard Workers 1970 was unveiled on 16 December 1980 near the entrance to what was then the Lenin Shipyard in Gdańsk, Poland. It commemorates the 42 or more people killed during the Coastal cities events in December 1970. It was created in the aftermath of the Gdańsk Agreement and is the first monument to the victims of communist oppression to be erected in a communist country.
It was designed by: Bogdan Pietruszka, Wiesław Szyślak, Wojciech Mokwiński and Jacek Krenz.

Gallery

See also
 Solidarity
 Gdańsk Shipyard

References

External links 

Buildings and structures in Gdańsk
Monuments and memorials in Poland
Solidarity (Polish trade union)
Memorials to victims of communism
Tourist attractions in Gdańsk